Jhonathan Alexander Díaz (born September 13, 1996) is a Venezuelan professional baseball pitcher in the Los Angeles Angels organization. Díaz signed with the Boston Red Sox as an international free agent in 2013. He made his MLB debut in 2021.

Career

Boston Red Sox organization
Díaz signed with the Boston Red Sox as an international free agent on August 9, 2013, for a $600,000 signing bonus. He spent his professional debut season of 2014 with the Dominican Summer League Red Sox, going 6–2 with a 1.63 ERA over  innings. He did not play in 2015. He spent the 2016 season with the GCL Red Sox, going 4–4 with a 2.85 ERA with 57 strikeouts over 60 innings. Díaz spent the 2017 season with the Greenville Drive, going 6–6 with a 4.57 ERA with 80 strikeouts over  innings. He split the 2018 season between Greenville and the Salem Red Sox, going a combined 11–9 with a 3.09 ERA with 151 strikeouts over  innings. Díaz spent the 2019 season back with Salem, going 9–8 with a 3.86 ERA and 118 strikeouts over  innings. He played for the Peoria Javelinas of the Arizona Fall League following the 2019 season. Díaz did not play in 2020 due to the cancellation of the Minor League Baseball season because of the COVID-19 pandemic.

Los Angeles Angels
Díaz became a free agent following the 2020 season and signed a minor league contract with the Los Angeles Angels. He split the 2021 minor league season between the Rocket City Trash Pandas and the Salt Lake Bees, going a combined 5–6 with a 4.01 ERA and 92 strikeouts over  innings. 

On September 17, 2021, Díaz's contract was selected to the active roster for the first time. He made his MLB debut that night versus the Oakland Athletics.

On November 18, 2022, after being designated for assignment, Díaz was non tendered and became a free agent. On December 15, Díaz resigned with the Angels on a minor league deal.

References

External links

1996 births
Living people
Sportspeople from Valencia, Venezuela
Major League Baseball players from Venezuela
Major League Baseball pitchers
Los Angeles Angels players
Dominican Summer League Red Sox players
Gulf Coast Red Sox players
Greenville Drive players
Salem Red Sox players
Peoria Javelinas players
Rocket City Trash Pandas players
Salt Lake Bees players
Venezuelan expatriate baseball players in the Dominican Republic
Venezuelan expatriate baseball players in the United States